Sunxiuqinia indica is a Gram-negative, facultative anaerobic, rod-shaped and non-motile bacterium from the genus of Sunxiuqinia which has been isolated from deep sea water from the Indian Ocean.

References

Bacteroidia
Bacteria described in 2020